Get Yer Ya-Ya's Out!: The Rolling Stones in Concert is the second live album by the Rolling Stones, released on 4 September 1970 on Decca Records in the UK and on London Records in the US. It was recorded in New York City and Baltimore in November 1969, just before the release of Let It Bleed. It is the first live album to reach number 1 in the UK. It was reported to have been issued in response to the well known bootleg Live'r Than You'll Ever Be. This was also the band’s final release under the Decca record label and not under their own label Rolling Stones Records.

History
The Rolling Stones 1969 American Tour's trek during November into December, with Terry Reid, B.B. King (replaced on some dates by Chuck Berry) and Ike and Tina Turner as supporting acts, played to packed houses. The tour was the first for Mick Taylor with the Stones, having replaced Brian Jones shortly before Jones's death in July; this was also the first album where he appeared fully and prominently, having only played on two songs on Let It Bleed. It was also the last tour to feature just the Stones – the band proper, along with co-founder, road manager and session/touring pianist Ian Stewart – without additional backing musicians.

The performances captured for this release were recorded on 27 November 1969 (one show) and 28 November 1969 (two shows) at New York City's Madison Square Garden, except for "Love in Vain", recorded in Baltimore on 26 November 1969. Overdubbing sessions were undertaken during January 1970 in London's Olympic Studios. The finished product featured an overdubbed lead vocal on all tracks except for "Love In Vain" and "Midnight Rambler," added back-up vocals on three tracks, and overdubbed guitar on two songs ("Little Queenie" and "Stray Cat Blues").  However, this album is widely recognized as one of few actual 'live' albums during this era.

The title Get Yer Ya-Ya's Out! is taken from a Blind Boy Fuller song, "Get Your Yas Yas Out". The lyric in Fuller's song was "Now you got to leave my house this morning, don't I'll throw your yas yas out o' door". In the context of Fuller's original song and its use in other blues music, "yas yas" appears as a folksy euphemism for "ass". However, Charlie Watts' T-shirt worn on the album's front cover shows a picture of a woman's breasts, suggesting an alternative explanation. Watts said that his wardrobe on the album cover was his usual stage clothing, along with Jagger's striped hat.

Some of the performances, as well as one of the two photography sessions for the album cover featuring Charlie Watts and a donkey, are depicted in the documentary film Gimme Shelter, and shows Watts and Mick Jagger on a section of the M6 motorway adjacent to Bescot Rail Depot in Birmingham, England, posing with a donkey. This is adjacent to where the RAC building now stands. The cover photo, however, was taken in early February 1970 in London, and does not originate from the 1969 session. The photo by David Bailey, featuring Watts with guitars and bass drums hanging from the neck of a donkey, was inspired by a line in Bob Dylan's song "Visions of Johanna": "Jewels and binoculars hang from the head of the mule" (though, as mentioned, the animal in the photo is a donkey, not a mule). The band would later say "we originally wanted an elephant but settled for a donkey".

Jagger commissioned the back cover, featuring song titles and credits with photographs of the group in performance, from British artist Steve Thomas, who has said he produced the design in 48 hours and that Jagger's response was "I really dig your artwork, man."

Release and reception

In the Rolling Stone review of the album, critic Lester Bangs said, "I have no doubt that it's the best rock concert ever put on record."

Get Yer Ya-Ya's Out! was released in September 1970, well into the sessions for their next studio album, Sticky Fingers, and was well-received critically and commercially, reaching number 1 in the UK and number 6 in the US, where it went platinum. Except for compilations, it was the last Rolling Stones album released through Decca Records in the UK and London Records in the US before they launched their own Rolling Stones Records label.

In August 2002, Get Yer Ya-Ya's Out! was reissued in a new remastered album and SACD digipak by ABKCO Records.

In November 2009, the album was reissued with unreleased songs by the Rolling Stones but also by opening acts B.B King and Ike & Tina Turner. It includes a DVD and a 56-page booklet.

The album has received consistent praise from critics as one of the greatest live albums ever made. In 2000 it was voted number 816 in Colin Larkin's All Time Top 1000 Albums. In 2007, NME ranked the album as the 7th greatest live album of all time. Q ranked the album as the 14th greatest live album of all time.

Track listing

Original release

40th anniversary deluxe box set

Disc one – original release
 "Jumpin' Jack Flash" – 4:03
 "Carol" – 3:46
 "Stray Cat Blues" – 3:47
 "Love in Vain" – 4:56
 "Midnight Rambler" – 9:04
 "Sympathy for the Devil" – 6:51
 "Live With Me" – 3:02
 "Little Queenie" – 4:33
 "Honky Tonk Women" – 3:34
 "Street Fighting Man" – 4:04

Disc two – unreleased tracks
 "Prodigal Son" (Robert Wilkins) – 4:04
 "You Gotta Move" (Fred McDowell, Rev. Gary Davis) – 2:18
 "Under My Thumb" – 3:38
 "I'm Free" – 2:47
 "(I Can't Get No) Satisfaction" – 5:38

Disc three – opening sets
 "Everyday I Have the Blues" – 2:27
 "How Blue Can You Get" – 5:30
 "That's Wrong Little Mama" – 4:11
 "Why I Sing The Blues" – 5:16
 "Please Accept My Love" – 4:52
 "Gimme Some Loving" – 0:49
 "Sweet Soul Music" – 1:16
 "Son of a Preacher Man" – 2:49
 "Proud Mary" – 3:07
 "I've Been Loving You Too Long" – 5:40
 "Come Together" – 3:36
 "Land of a Thousand Dances" – 2:40

Disc four – bonus DVD (2.0 and 5.1)
 Introduction (Madison Square Garden)
 "Prodigal Son" – 2:40
 "You Gotta Move" – 1:58
 Photo shoot (of album cover) – 3:30
 Keith in studio – 1:40
 "Under My Thumb" / "I'm Free" / Backstage with Jimi Hendrix – 6:09
 "(I Can't Get No) Satisfaction" / Outside waiting for transport – 10:45
 Credits

Bonus track recording dates
Audio
 "Prodigal Son" – 4:04 
 "You Gotta Move" – 2:18 
 "Under My Thumb" – 3:38 
 "I'm Free" – 2:47 
 "(I Can't Get No) Satisfaction" – 5:38 

Video
 "Prodigal Son" – 2:40 
 "You Gotta Move" – 1:50 
 "Under My Thumb" – 3:30 
 "I'm Free" – 1:30 
 "(I Can't Get No) Satisfaction" – 6:00

Personnel
 Mick Jagger – vocals; harmonica 
 Keith Richards – guitar, backing vocals
 Mick Taylor – guitar
 Bill Wyman – bass guitar
 Charlie Watts – drums
Additional musicians
 Ian Stewart – piano

Production
 Recording and mixing engineer – Glyn Johns
 Mixing and editing – Andy Johns and Roy Thomas Baker
 Tape operator – Chris Kimsey
 Photography – David Bailey
 Art director – John Kosh
 Recording by Wally Heider Mobile

Charts and certifications

Charts

Certifications

References

1970 live albums
2009 video albums
Albums produced by Glyn Johns
The Rolling Stones live albums
Live video albums
ABKCO Records live albums
Decca Records live albums
ABKCO Records video albums
London Records live albums
Albums produced by Mick Jagger
Albums produced by Mick Taylor
Albums produced by Keith Richards
Albums produced by Charlie Watts
Albums produced by Bill Wyman
Albums recorded at Madison Square Garden
The Rolling Stones documentary films
The Rolling Stones video albums